Robert Davies (also known as "Bob Pugh"; born 1861) was a Welsh footballer who played as a forward for various clubs in Wrexham in the 1880s and 1890s. He also made three appearances for Wales, all against Ireland.

Football career
Davies was born in Wrexham and started his career with the Wrexham Civil Service Club before joining Wrexham in 1881. Described as "a slightly built individual with much natural ability" who was "full of attacking instinct" and possessed a "very accurate shot". He was a superb dribbler who regularly won dribbling competitions; despite this he was a keen advocate of the combination game and helped introduce this into Wrexham in place of the individualism that was still prevalent there until the 1880s.

In 1883, he was part of the Wrexham side who won the Welsh Cup, defeating the Druids 1–0. Wrexham next reached the final in 1890, but this time lost by a single goal to Chirk.

His first international appearance came on 17 March 1883, when he was selected to play against Ireland; the match ended with the scores level with one goal each. Davies retained his place for the next match, eleven months later, also against Ireland in Wales's first match in the inaugural British Home Championship; Wales won comfortably putting six goals past the Irish, with no reply. Davies was not selected again until April 1885, when he failed to score in an 8–2 victory over the hapless Irish.

International appearances
Davies made three appearances for Wales in international matches, as follows:

Later career
Davies was later a referee for the Football Association of Wales and managed the Albion Hotel in Wrexham.

Honours
Wrexham
 Welsh Cup winners: 1883
 Welsh Cup finalists: 1890

References

External links

1861 births
Footballers from Wrexham
Year of death missing
Welsh footballers
Wales international footballers
Association football forwards
Wrexham A.F.C. players